Carlos Alberto Ruiz Gutiérrez (born 25 January 2002) is a Peruvian footballer who plays as a forward for UTC, on loan from Sporting Cristal.

Career statistics

Club

Notes

References

2002 births
Living people
Peruvian footballers
Peru youth international footballers
Association football forwards
Sporting Cristal footballers
Universidad Técnica de Cajamarca footballers